Pyramodon is a genus of pearlfishes,  with these currently recognized species:
 Pyramodon lindas Markle & Olney, 1990 (blackedge pearlfish)
 Pyramodon parini Markle & Olney, 1990
 Pyramodon punctatus (Regan, 1914) (dogtooth pearlfish)
 Pyramodon ventralis H. M. Smith & Radcliffe, 1913 (pallid pearlfish)

References

Carapidae